The 1974 Gael Linn Cup, the most important representative competition for elite level participants in the women's team field sport of camogie, was won by Connacht, who defeated Munster in the final, played at Ballinsasloe.

Arrangements
Munster defeated Ulster 10–4 to 1–3 in Shannon. Fielding an all-Galway selection, holders Connacht defeated Leinster 6–3 to 1–2 in Ballinsasloe and then retained the Gael-Linn Cup in a hugely entertaining final also at Duggan Park, Ballinasloe. Munster had a goal disallowed in the closing stages for square ball as they fought back from six points down. Margaret Murphy scored two of Connacht's goals, while Nono McHugh contributed 1–5.
The Connacht Tribune noted: This Galway team showed an understanding and a maturity that stood them in good stead. From goalkeeper out they hurled with great confidence and whenever Munster fought back they were able to raise their game and take control again. Stickwork and ball control were admirable but, above all, and glory to them for it, they had spiritand the will to win.  Agnes Hourigan wrote in the Irish Press: Nono McHugh, the Connacht right wing, was the star of the game. She played a vital part in her own position, was always at hand to help in defence and attack and scored a personal tally of 1–5. The all Galway side were fitter, played more constructive camogie and with less chances were two points in front at half time though facing a stiff breeze.

Final stages

References

External links
 Camogie Association

1974 in camogie
1974